Ineši Parish is an administrative unit of Cēsis Municipality in the Vidzeme region of Latvia.

References

Parishes of Latvia
Cēsis Municipality
Vidzeme